The Alexandria Metropolitan Statistical Area is a metropolitan area in central Louisiana that covers two parishes – Rapides and Grant. As of the 2000 census, the MSA had a population of 145,035 (though a July 1, 2009 estimate placed the population at 154,101).

History
The Alexandria metropolitan area was first defined in 1973. Then known as the Alexandria Standard Metropolitan Statistical Area (Alexandria SMSA), it consisted of two parishes - Rapides and Grant - and had a population of 131,749. By the census of 1980, the population had grown to 151,985, a 15% increase over the previous census.

In 1983, the official name was shortened to the Alexandria Metropolitan Statistical Area (Alexandria MSA), which is still in use to date. That same year, Grant Parish was removed from the MSA, leaving only Rapides Parish. A total of 135,282 people lived in Rapides Parish in 1980. That number had declined to 131,556 by 1990 and 126,337 in 2000.

Grant Parish was again added to the Alexandria MSA in 2003.

Parishes
Rapides
Grant

Communities

 Alexandria (Principal city)
 Ball (suburb of Alexandria)
 Boyce
 Cheneyville
 Colfax
 Creola (suburb of Alexandria)
 Deville

 Dry Prong
 Forest Hill
 Gardner
 Georgetown
 Glenmora
 Lecompte
 Libuse

 McNary
 Montgomery
 Pineville (suburb of Alexandria)
 Pollock (suburb of Alexandria)
 Prospect
 Tioga (suburb of Alexandria)
 Woodworth (suburb of Alexandria)

Demographics
As of the census of 2000, there were 153,922 people, 56,193 households, and 40,083 families residing within the MSA. The racial makeup of the MSA was 68.95% White, 24.04% African American, 1.56% Native American, 1.27% Asian, 0.13% Pacific Islander, 0.82% from other races, and 1.25% from two or more races. Hispanic or Latino of any race were 6.35% of the population.

The median income for a household in the MSA was $29,739, and the median income for a family was $35,775. Males had a median income of $30,505 versus $20,477 for females. The per capita income for the MSA was $15,249.

See also
Louisiana census statistical areas
List of cities, towns, and villages in Louisiana
List of census-designated places in Louisiana

References

 
Geography of Rapides Parish, Louisiana
Geography of Grant Parish, Louisiana